The Jardin botanique des Montagnes Noires (6 hectares) is a botanical garden specializing in conifers, located in Le Fell, Spezet, Finistère, Brittany, France. It is open daily; an admission fee is charged.

The garden was established in 1995 and dedicated primarily to conifers. It currently contains about 700 species in total, including 500 conifer taxa as well as bamboos, camellias, heather, magnolias, rhododendrons, and roses.

See also 
 List of botanical gardens in France

References 
 Jardin botanique des Montagnes Noires
 Parcs et Jardins entry (French)
 Association des Parcs et Jardins de Bretagne entry (French)
 Gralon.net entry (French)

Gardens in Finistère
Botanical gardens in France